The Wilshire Federal Building is an office building in Los Angeles, located on Wilshire and Sepulveda Boulevards in the area of Sawtelle.  Many of Los Angeles’ federal offices are located in this building. The building actually is not located on municipal Los Angeles land, but in a small, unincorporated area of Los Angeles County enclosed by the city, known as unincorporated Sawtelle.

Construction on the Wilshire Federal Building began in 1968 and was completed in 1969. It was listed on the National Register of Historic Places in 2020.

The building is often the site of protests and demonstrations.  For example, during the Iranian Revolution, the Federal Building was the scene of demonstrations both supporting the Revolution and supporting the Shah.

The Federal Bureau of Investigation (FBI) Los Angeles field office is in Suite 1700.

See also 
 West LA VA
 Los Angeles National Cemetery
 List of Los Angeles federal buildings

References

External links

Skyscraper office buildings in Los Angeles
Government buildings in Los Angeles
Federal buildings in Los Angeles
Federal buildings in the United States
Sawtelle, Los Angeles
Sepulveda Boulevard
Wilshire Boulevard
1960s architecture in the United States
West Los Angeles
National Register of Historic Places in Los Angeles
Charles Luckman buildings
Office buildings completed in 1969